Cost is the value of money that has been used to produce something and is therefore no longer available.

Cost may also refer to:

Economics
Economic cost, an overview of cost in the field of economics
Opportunity cost, the cost of something measured by the inability to spend the money elsewhere
Historical cost, also known as accounting cost, the original value of an economic item
Variable cost, costs of doing business that increase or decrease with the amount of revenue, such as labor and fuel
Fixed cost, costs of doing business that do not change, such as rent and administration
Total cost, fixed plus variable cost
Average cost, the total cost of production divided by the number of items produced
Average fixed cost
Average variable cost
Marginal cost, the decrease in costs resulting from producing more items
Cost curve, a graph of the cost of production as a function of the number of items produced

Other uses
 Cost, Texas, an unincorporated community in the United States
 Biological cost
 Court costs
 Costs (English law)
 Costs (album), a 2011 album from Gideon
 European Cooperation in Science and Technology, abbreviated COST, a European intergovernmental organization
 Costco NASDAQ ticker symbol
 The Cost (album), the sixth studio album by The Frames
 The Cost (band), an American punk rock group
 "The Cost" (The Wire), a 2002 television episode
 The Cost (film), a 1920 American silent drama film